The 1976 New South Wales Rugby Football League premiership was the 69th season of Sydney's professional rugby league football competition, Australia's first. Twelve teams, including six of 1908's foundation clubs and another six from around Sydney, competed for the J. J. Giltinan Shield and WD & HO Wills Cup during the season, which culminated in a grand final between the Manly-Warringah and Parramatta clubs. NSWRFL teams also competed for the 1976 Amco Cup.

Season summary
This season Eastern Suburbs became the first rugby league team, and one of the first in Australian sport, to have a sponsor's name appear on their jersey.

Twenty-two regular season rounds were played from March till August resulting in a top five of Manly-Warringah, Parramatta, St. George, Eastern Suburbs and Canterbury-Bankstown, who battled it out in the finals.

In a one-off match that would form the foundation of the modern World Club Challenge, the previous season's premiers, Eastern Suburbs played British Champions St Helens R.F.C. on the 29th of June at the Sydney Cricket Ground.  26,865 turned out to see the Roosters beat the Saints 25 to 2.

This season Parramatta front-rower and captain Ray Higgs won both the Rothmans Medal and the Rugby League Week player of the year award.

The 1976 season also saw the retirement from the League of future Australian Rugby League Hall of Fame inductee, Graeme Langlands.

Teams

Ladder

Finals
Parramatta were first into the Grand final, triumphing 23–17 in a bloody and brutal major semi-final against Manly. Manly earned a grand final berth the following week, surviving a Canterbury comeback to win 15–12.

Chart

Grand final

In 1976, after 30 years of competition, Parramatta reached their first grand final since their admission into the NSWRFL premiership in 1947. Their opponents were Manly-Warringah, who had also joined the premiership in 1947, but were playing in their eighth Grand final, having previously won in 1972 and 1973 with captain Bob Fulton, fullback Graham Eadie, forward Terry Randall and lock Ian Martin having played in those two premiership teams.

Jim Porter scored first, getting Parramatta to a 5–0 lead. A penalty goal to Graham Eadie closed the score to 5–2 before Alan Thompson sidestepped through to send Phil Lowe in for Manly's first and only try. Scores were locked 7–7 at half time.

Geoff Gerard scored an unconverted try for the Eels early in the second half, then two penalties gave Manly an 11–10 lead.

Parramatta missed a critical opportunity to win the game and their first ever premiership with ten minutes of the match remaining: 15 metres out from a wide-open tryline, Eels winger Neville Glover dropped the pass from John Moran which would have given the Eels the match-winning try in the Paddington Hill corner.

Another penalty gave Manly a 13–10 lead. In the frantic dying minutes Parramatta threw everything they had at the Manly defence including the infamous "flying wedge" of dubious legality which had Ron Hilditch at the apex of a phalanx of players driving him towards the line. The wedge was somehow stopped by Eadie a foot short of the try line.

The Manly defence held and the Sea Eagles secured their third premiership in five seasons, while the Eels would have to wait five more years for their first.

It was Bob Fulton's 213rd and final match for Manly after a brilliant ten-year career with the club and the grand final victory was largely credited to his experience and brilliance. He was full of emotion as he accepted the J.J. Giltinan Shield and was able to end his playing career at Manly on the highest note. He would later return to the club as a successful coach in the 1980s but first he would finish his playing years and then commence coaching at Eastern Suburbs (Fulton would join Easts in 1977, unable to resist a big-money offer from the club that was backed by one of Australia's richest men and a big supporter of the future rugby league Immortal, Kerry Packer).

Manly's win was a triumph for the powerful triumvirate of Fulton, coach Frank Stanton and Secretary Ken Arthurson who would all go on to higher honours in the game. For Stanton, it was his first success in a coaching career which was to bring two premierships and two Ashes-winning Kangaroo tours. Arthurson had brought to the club players of a calibre to enable five Grand final appearances in the 1970s for four victories. He would go on to become the Chairman of the New South Wales Rugby League and later the Australian Rugby League.

Manly-Warringah 13 (Tries: Lowe. Goals: Eadie 5/6)

Parramatta 10 (Tries: Porter, Gerard. Goals: Peard 2/3)

Referee: Gary CookAttendance: 57,343

Player statistics
The following statistics are as of the conclusion of Round 22.

Top 5 point scorers

Top 5 try scorers

Top 5 goal scorers

References

External links
  Heads, Ian (1992) True Blue The Story of the NSW Rugby League, Ironbark Press, Randwick, NSW
  Whiticker, Alan (1994) Grand finals of the NSW Rugby League, Gary Allen Pty Ltd, Smithfield, NSW
  Rugby League Tables – Season 1976 The World of Rugby League
Results: 1971-80 at rabbitohs.com.au
1976 J J Giltinan Shield and WD & HO Wills Cup at rleague.com
NSWRFL season 1976 at rugbyleagueproject.org
1976 Grand final at soaringseaeagles.tripod.com

New South Wales Rugby League premiership
NSWRFL season